The Viseu Football Association (Associação de Futebol de Viseu, abrv. AF Viseu) is the district governing body for the all football competitions in the Portuguese district of Viseu. It is also the regulator of the clubs registered in the district.

Notable clubs in the Viseu FA

 Clube de Futebol "Os Repesenses"
 Académico de Viseu
 Clube Desportivo de Tondela
 SC Lamego
 S.L. Nelas
 GD Mangualde

Main Competitions

Divisão de Honra
The Divisão de Honra is the first tier of the Viseu Football Association. Between 1927 and 1947 it was called 1ª Divisão. At the end of each season, the top-finishing team is promoted to the Campeonato de Portugal, and the lowest-ranked teams are relegated to the AF Viseu second tier.

Eighteen different teams have won the division title; the most successful is Académico de Viseu, with seventeen wins. The inaugural champion was Lusitano.

Primeira Divisão
The Primeira Divisão is the second tier in the Viseu district division. It is divided into two zones that divide the district: Zona Norte and Zona Sul. The two winners from each zone play against each other in one play-off to crown the champion.

Segunda Divisão
The Segunda Divisão was the third tier of the Viseu Football Association. It was abolished after the restructure of the Portuguese football league system, with the 2010–11 season being the competition's last. The final champion was Mangualde.

Taça AF Viseu

Supertaça AF Viseu
The Supertaça AF Viseu, created in 2011, is a match contested by the champions of the previous Divisão de Honra season and the holders of Taça AF Viseu.

See also
 Taça AF Viseu
 Portuguese District Football Associations
 Portuguese football competitions
 List of football clubs in Portugal

References

External links
AFV (Viseu Football Association) 

Viseu
Viseu District